The 2001 Saskatchewan Scott Tournament of Hearts women's provincial curling championship, was held January 24–28 at the Estevan Arena in Estevan, Saskatchewan. The winning team of Michelle Ridgway, represented Saskatchewan at the 2001 Scott Tournament of Hearts in Sudbury, Ontario, where the team finished round robin with a 4–7 record.

Teams

 Sue Altman
 Sherry Anderson
 June Campbell
 Barbara Griffin
 Kristy Lewis
 Michelle Ridgway
 Patty Rocheleau
 Cathy Trowell

Standings

Playoffs

References

Sport in Estevan
Scotties Tournament of Hearts provincial tournaments
Saskatchewan Scott Tournament of Hearts
Curling in Saskatchewan
Scott Tournament of Hearts
Saskatchewan Scott Tournament of Hearts